The siege of Cusco (May 6, 1536 – March 1537) was the siege of the city of Cusco by the Inca army under the command of Sapa Inca Manco Inca Yupanqui against a garrison of Spanish conquistadors and Indian auxiliaries led by Hernando Pizarro in the hope to restore the Inca Empire (1438–1533).  The siege lasted ten months and was ultimately unsuccessful.

Background
Francisco Pizarro, Hernando's older brother, received chief rights of discovery and conquest in Peru, or New Castile, and the Governorship of the territory from King Charles I of Spain in the Capitulation of July 1529. Pizarro and his Spanish conquistadors invaded Peru and captured Atahualpa, the Sapa Inca, on November 16, 1532, at Cajamarca. The events at Cajamarca initiated the Spanish conquest of the Incas. The Spaniards later killed Atahualpa in July 1533, after deceptively acquiring a ransom of over 39,000 pounds of gold and silver for his release. Atahualpa's death exacerbated pre-existing dynastic rivalries for the Inca throne and plunged the Incas into a stage of disorder and disunity. Francisco Pizarro installed Tupac Hualpa, one of Atahualpa's brothers and rivals, in September 1533, as the leading Inca in an attempt to legalistically recognize indigenous lineage and subordinate the Incas under Spanish authority. Chalcuchima, a leader of Atahualpa's remnant loyalist troops killed Tupac Hualpa at Jauja. Francisco Pizarro replaced Tupac Hualpa with Manco Inca, another one of Atahualpa's brothers, and son of the last truly unified Inca King, Huayna Capac. Pizarro first met Manco Inca on the initial Spanish march to secure Cusco, and Pizarro's decision to emplace Manco Inca as king stemmed from the Spaniard's desire to continue and perpetuate Inca internal discord. Manco decided to join the Spanish side in hopes of strengthening his position within the Inca's dynastic struggle against survivors of the Atahualpa loyalist faction. A Spanish expedition led by Francisco Pizarro had captured the Inca capital of Cusco on November 15, 1533 after defeating an Inca army headed by general Quisquis. The following month, the conquistadors supported the official coronation of Manco Inca as Inca emperor to facilitate Spanish control over the Inca empire. Real power rested with the Spaniards and they frequently humiliated Manco when Juan Pizarro and Gonzalo Pizarro, two of Francisco's younger brothers, controlled the city. Juan Pizarro imprisoned Manco after he attempted an escape in November 1535. Hernando Pizarro assumed control of Cusco after returning from Spain and hoping to improve relations with Manco, for both personal and Spanish interests, released the Inca leader from confinement in January 1536. Manco remained under Spanish supervision but achieved greater freedom of movement. Manco Inca left Cusco on April 18, 1536 after securing Hernando Pizarro’s approval to conduct religious ceremonial activities in the Yucay Valley and return with gold. Instead, Manco went to Lares and conducted a meeting with Inca military chiefs and warriors, over ceremonial chicha, to discuss and finalize siege and rebellion plans.

Siege
Hernando, realizing the grave mistake, sent his brother Juan Pizarro and seventy cavalrymen from Cusco on a mission to disperse the Incas gathered in the nearby Yucay Valley. Juan Pizarro's expedition located a mass of Inca troops in the valley and cleared them out after a brief skirmish. The Spaniards secured the valley and remained in position for three or four days without facing any significant battles or coordinated Inca attacks. Juan quickly understood why he faced limited Inca resistance in the valley when a horseman dispatched by Hernando Pizarro informed Juan that Inca warriors had amassed on the hills surrounding Cusco. The Inca emperor did not attack Cusco at once; instead, he waited to assemble his full army estimated at between 100,000 and 200,000 men strong around the city (some sources suggest numbers as low as 40,000). Against them there were 190 Spaniards, 80 of them horsemen, and several thousand Indian auxiliaries. The Incas made their first move on May 5, 1536, by seizing the unoccupied Sacsayhuamán fortress above Cusco, which the Spaniards had vacated to fortify themselves in the city. Sacsayhuamán provided the Incas with high-ground above the city and a favorable fortified position from which to launch offensive attacks. Additionally, the steep elevation encountered while approaching the fortress inhibited the use of cavalry, effectively neutralizing one of the Spaniards primary tactical advantages and potential options for counter-assault. The siege started on May 6, 1536 with a full-scale attack towards the main square of the city; Inca warriors descended from Sacsyhuamán into the city and immediately securing the areas around Colcampata and Cora Cora and eventually succeeded in capturing most of the city. The Inca warriors barraged the city with slings projecting hot stones wrapped in cotton and incendiary arrows that ignited thatched roofs and quickly spread fire throughout Cusco. Meanwhile, the Spaniards took refuge in two large buildings near the main plaza, barricading themselves inside the hall of Suntur Huasi and Hatun Cancha, two buildings facing each other on the eastern side of the square. The conquistadors fended off Inca attacks from these constructions and mounted frequent raids against their besiegers. The raids, with moderate but short-term success, included small waves of cavalry and foot-soldier elements sent out to break the Inca ranks.  The Incas recognized the significant battlefield effectives of horses, so the native warriors planted elevated peltasts, around the city, that launched ayllos to entangle and disable the cavalrymen.

Realizing the direness of the situation, after about a week of being pinned down, the Spanish decided their survival depended on recapturing Sacsayhuamán. Pasac, a rival and relative of Manco who sided with the Spanish devised a successful plan to assault the fortress. To relieve their position, the Spaniards decided to assault the walled complex of Sacsayhuamán which served as the main base of operations for the Inca army. Fifty horsemen, led by Juan Pizarro, and accompanied by Indian auxiliaries broke through the Inca army files and burst off at a gallop toward Chinchaysuyo. The Spaniards continued northwest, feigning retreat toward Lima, which drew Inca warriors out from the fortress. Then Pizarro and his men turned around and attacked Sacsayhuamán from outside the city. During the frontal assault against the building's large walls, a stone struck Juan Pizarro in the head; he died days later from the injury sustained. The following day, the Spaniards resisted several Inca counterattacks and mounted a renewed assault at night using scaling ladders. In this way, they captured the terrace walls of Sacsayhuamán while the Inca army held on to the two tall towers of the complex. The Inca commanders, Paucar Huaman and the high priest or Willaq Umu, decided to leave the confinement of the towers and fight their way towards Calca, the site of Manco Inca's headquarters, to bring back reinforcements. The attempt was successful and the towers were left under the command of Titu Cusi Gualpa, an Inca nobleman. Despite Titu's fierce resistance, the Spaniards and their auxiliaries stormed the towers so that when the Inca commanders returned, Sacsayhuamán was firmly under their control.

The capture of Sacsayhuamán eased the pressure on the Spanish garrison at Cusco; the fighting now turned into a series of daily skirmishes interrupted only by the Inca religious tradition of halting attacks during the new moon. During this period, the Spaniards successfully implemented terror tactics to demoralize the Inca army, which included an order to kill any woman caught and cutting off the hands of captured men. Encouraged by their successes, Hernando Pizarro led an attack against Manco Inca's headquarters which were now at Ollantaytambo, further away from Cusco.  Manco Inca defeated the Spanish expedition at the Battle of Ollantaytambo by taking advantage of the fortifications and the difficult terrain around the site. The Spanish garrison had more success with several raids to gather food from regions near Cusco; these incursions allowed them to replenish their almost exhausted provisions. Meanwhile, Manco Inca tried to capitalize on his success at Ollantaytambo with a renewed assault on Cusco, but a Spanish cavalry party had a chance encounter with the Inca army thus ruining any hope of surprise. That same night the Spaniards mounted a full-scale attack which achieved complete surprise and inflicted severe casualties on Manco Inca's troops.

Aftermath 
After 10 months of vicious fighting in Cusco, with low morale playing a factor, Manco Inca decided to raise the siege at Cusco and withdraw to Ollantaytambo and then Vilcabamba, where he established the small Neo-Inca State. It is suggested by some that by this action he threw away his only real chance to rebuff the Spaniards from the lands of the Inca Empire, but it was probably the only realistic choice he had considering the arrival of Spanish reinforcements from Chile led by Diego de Almagro. Upon facing victory and the availability of expanding his own reign into Peru, Almagro seized the city once having achieved victory for Spain and had Hernando and Gonzalo Pizzaro imprisoned. Gonzalo escaped, to later face Almagro in a personal triumph at the Battle of Las Salinas.

Notes

References
 Hemming, John. The conquest of the Incas. London: Macmillan, 1993. 
 

Battles involving the Inca Empire
Sieges involving Spain
History of Cusco Region
Conflicts in 1536
Conflicts in 1537
1536 in the Inca civilization
16th century in Peru
1537 in the Inca civilization
1536 in the Spanish Empire
1537 in the Spanish Empire